Paraglaciecola mesophila is a Gram-negative, slightly halophilic, heterotrophic and motile bacterium from the genus of Paraglaciecola which has been isolated from the liquor of an ascidian (Halocynthia aurantium) from the Troista Bay in Russia.

References

Bacteria described in 2003
Alteromonadales